Arthur McQuiston Miller (August 6, 1861 – October 28, 1929) was an American educator, zoologist, geologist, and college football coach. He was the first football coach at Kentucky State College—now known as University of Kentucky—in 1892. Miller was also a professor of geology and zoology and the first dean of arts and sciences at school.

Early life
Miller was born on August 6, 1861, in Eaton, Ohio, to parents Robert and Margaret Ann (née McQuiston) Miller. He spent his youth there, and enjoyed searching for trilobites as a pastime. From 1880 to 1882, he attended the College of Wooster before transferring to Princeton University in 1883. From Princeton, Miller received a Bachelor of Arts degree in 1884 and a Master of Arts degree in 1887. He remained there under a fellowship through 1889. Miller spent a year as a professor at Wilson College and studied abroad for a year at the University of Munich.

University of Kentucky
In 1892, Miller joined the faculty at Kentucky State College—now known as the University of Kentucky—as a professor of geology and zoology. That year, he also coached the football team in its inaugural season at the urging of the students, which came despite his limited knowledge of the sport. Kentucky finished with a 2–4–1 record, and Miller allowed John A. Thompson, who was more familiar with the game, to coach the team the following season.

By 1907, Miller was the head of the geological, zoological, and entomological departments at Kentucky, and "proved himself to be the friend and patron of pure athletics, as his heart co-operation and assistance can always be relied upon in any matter pertaining to the interests of the physical attitude." From 1908 to 1917, he served as the school's first dean of arts and sciences. During the First World War, he worked as a field geology consultant and authored several scientific studies.

In 1922, Miller wrote an article in the journal Science decrying William Jennings Bryan for his actions to suppress the teaching of evolution in Kentucky schools. In June 1925, Miller was informed that he could be called upon to testify in defense of John T. Scopes, a University of Kentucky alumnus and former student of Miller's, during the Scopes Monkey Trial. Miller retired from the university as a professor emeritus on June 30, 1925.

Later life and legacy
Miller spent his retirement in Asheville, North Carolina. He died of heart disease in Palatka, Florida, on October 28, 1929, at the age of 68. He is interred at Mound Hill Union Cemetery in Eaton, Ohio. Miller Hall on the University of Kentucky campus was named in his honor in 1940.

Head coaching record

Published works
The Lead and Zinc Bearing Rocks of Central Kentucky (1905)
The Geology of Kentucky (1919)

References

External links
 

1861 births
1929 deaths
19th-century American educators
20th-century American academics
American geologists
American zoologists
Kentucky Wildcats football coaches
University of Kentucky faculty
College of Wooster alumni
Ludwig Maximilian University of Munich alumni
Princeton University alumni
People from Eaton, Ohio
Coaches of American football from Ohio
Educators from Ohio